Eva Malin Sofia Levenstad (born 13 September 1988) is a Swedish football coach and former defender. She previously played for FC Rosengård (formerly known as LdB FC Malmö) of the Damallsvenskan and  spent a short period on loan at AIK in 2014. She stopped playing in 2014, but returned to Rosengård in a coaching capacity in 2016. In 2017, she was the head coach of Rosengård – the youngest head coach in Damallsvenskan. She resumed her playing career with the club in 2019. In 2021 she stopped playing again to take a position as an assistant coach at Linköpings FC.

Club career

In November 2013, Champions Malmö sent Levenstad on loan to AIK for the first half of the 2014 season.

Levenstad retired from playing in 2014, but was named FC Rosengård's assistant coach in November 2016. In the club's previous guise as LdB FC Malmö, Levenstad had been team captain and won three league titles. In September 2017, with the termination of FC Rosengård's head coach Jack Majgaard Jensen's contract, it was announced that Levenstad was to continue as Rosengård's head coach for the remainder of the 2017 season.

In February 2019, she came out of retirement to resume her playing career. In December 2020 she stopped playing again to take a position as an assistant coach at Linköpings FC.

International career

She debuted for the Swedish national team in February 2008, a 2–0 win over Norway. Levenstad was included in the Sweden squad for the 2012 London Olympics.

Personal life

References

External links

 
  (archive)
 

1988 births
Living people
Swedish women's footballers
Sweden women's international footballers
Footballers at the 2012 Summer Olympics
Olympic footballers of Sweden
FC Rosengård players
Damallsvenskan players
AIK Fotboll (women) players
Swedish LGBT sportspeople
Lesbian sportswomen
LGBT association football players
People from Vellinge Municipality
Women's association football defenders
Sportspeople from Skåne County